Thirumathi Hitler is an Indian Tamil language drama television show which aired on Zee Tamil from 14 December 2020 and ended on 8 January 2022, and is digitally available on ZEE5. The series stars Keerthana Podhuval and Amit Bhargav in the lead roles. It is an official remake of the Hindi television series Guddan Tumse Na Ho Payega.

From business to family, AJ believes that everything should be done in an orderly manner. Frustrated with his perfectionism, his daughters-in-law plot to get him married to an easy-going woman.

Plot 
Abinav Janardhan (AJ), who became a recluse after losing his wife Pravalika, is forced to remarry. He refuses at first, but agrees on the condition that the marriage should happen within a span of 15 days. AJ's three daughters-in-law – Archana, Maya, and Chitra – conduct a suyamwaram (for selecting a bride). Hasini accidentally enters the suyamwaram and mistakes AJ's daughters-in-law to be the producers of the film she was supposed to be auditioning for.

Archana and Chitra invite Hasini to meet AJ's mother, Jayamma, before learning that she was selected for AJ to marry. After hearing this she got shocked and angry and humiliates AJ. The next day Hasini's sister Swetha shows the newspaper with fake news about Hasini and AJ. Hasini is infuriated and goes to AJ's house where Komali humiliates him again. After she leaves, Jayamma tells him that instead of marrying a girl who wanted all wealth he could marry a girl who wants to save and protect her self-respect. AJ decides to marry Hasini and tries to convince her but all his efforts go in vain.

One day Hasini sees a girl with Badhri, her sister Swetha's lover, and mistakes that girl to be Swetha, later to find out she is Badhri's wife. Hasini is shocked and informs Swetha, who already knew he was married. Hasini warns Badri not to cross paths with Swetha, who attempts to commit suicide afterwards. AJ asks the doctor to perform the operation to save Swetha after Hasini admits her to the hospital. Hasini asks him to solve her problem and save her sister from Badri. With the help of a police officer, AJ threatens Badhri and makes him let go of Swetha and in turn asks Hasini to marry him.

At one point Hasini runs from AJ's house with Archana's help during the mehendi function. AJ is irritated and declares that he is going to marry Komali. During AJ's marriage, Badri blackmails Hasini to marry AJ by kidnapping Swetha. Hasini agrees, and knocks out Komali. AJ marries Hasin, who blames him for blackmailing and marrying her. Hasini is kidnapped on her way to police station to file a complaint against AJ by Vikram, a CBI officer. Vikram says that AJ is the reason for Pravalika's death, the one who pushed her off a cliff, and wants him to be jailed. Vikram also tells Hasini about the secret locker AJ possesses which contains some evidence against AJ. He threatens Hasini that if she does not help him he would arrest and imprison her father. Hasini enters AJ's house in an agreement that both of them had to prove that each other had married them by cheating.

Cast

Main 
 Keerthana Podhuval as Hasini Abhinav Janardhan (2020–2022)
 (Hasini also nicknamed by Hitler as Cakekaari) A kind-hearted, jovial and easy-going girl, who married AJ and became AJ's wife, Jayamma's daughter-in-law, Archana, Maya and Chitra's mother-in-law.
 Amit Bhargav as Abhinav Janardhan (2020–2022)
 (AJ also nicknamed by people around as Hitler ) A professional cook, who always needs to be perfect ; Jayamma's son; Archana, Maya and Chitra's father-in-law; Pravali's former husband and Hasini's husband

Recurring 
 Ambika as Jayamma: AJ's mother, Hasini's mother-in-law (2020–2022) 
 Manjula Paritala (2020) as Pravalika 
 Yamuna Chinnadurai (2021–2022) replaced Manjula Paritala as Pravalika: AJ's first wife and Jayamma's daughter-in-law
 Sowmya Rao Nadig (2020–2021) as Archana  
 Mahalakshmi (2021–2022) replaced Sowmya Rao Nadig as Archana: AJ's first daughter-in-law, Varadhan's wife
 Subalakshmi Rangan (2020–2021) as Maya
 SK Sivanyaa (2021–2022) replaced Subulakshmi Rangan as Maya: AJ's second daughter-in-law, Kishore's wife
 Bhavya Sree as Chitra: AJ's third daughter-in-law, Badhri's sister (2020–2022) 
 Keerthana as Keerthana Chakravarthy: Chakravarthy's second wife, Swetha's mother and Hasini's step-mother (2020–2022)
 G. Gnanasambandam as Chakravarthy: Hasini and Swetha's father; Keerthana's husband (2020–2022)
 Swetha Senthilkumar as Swetha: Keerthana's daughter and Hasini's half-sister (2020–2022)
 Dharish Jayaseelan as Badhri: The Inspector; Swetha's love interest; Hasini's enemy and Chitra's brother and Sindhu's husband (2020–2022)
 Ammu as Sindhu: Badhri's wife (2020–2022)
 Prithvi Krishna as Vardhan: Archana's husband and AJ's parental son  (2020–2022)
 Sugesh as Kishore: Maya's husband and AJ's parental son (2020–2022) 
 Janani as Komali: AJ's ex-fiancée and Maya's cousin (2020)
 Kousalya Senthamarai as Bhagyalakshmi: Vanangamudhi's grandmother and later as helping & caring women of AJ's family.

Cameo 
 Chaitra Reddy as Pournami: AJ's friend 
 Vanitha Vijayakumar as Rajeshwari: AJ's aunt 
 Arvind Kathare as AJ's former driver (episode-1)
 Nachathira as Bombay Divya: Hasini's friend and Manohar's wife (episode 202–204)
 Shreekumar as Manohar: Divya's husband (Episode 202–204)
Puvi as Vanangamudhi: AJ's friend and Shantanayaki's husband 
 Ashwini Radhakrishna as Shantanayaki: Vanangamudhi' wife

Soundtrack 
The theme music was composed by Osho Venkat 
The song "Then Thuliyin" was composed by Puneet Dixit, where the karaoke was same in other versions of the series. This song was sung by Aslam and Sukanya (Sa Re Ga Ma Pa singers) and Lyrics by Yougin.

Special episodes 
From 1 March to 18 March 2021, Thirumathi Hitler had an arc for AJ's marriage sequences titled Thirumathi Hitler Thirumana Kondattam. The wedding scenes were shot in Bangalore and Mysore.

From 9 to 11 August 2021, the series aired one-hour special episodes on prime time due to a shortage of episodes of the next series Gokulathil Seethai.

From 23 August 2021 to 11 September 2021, the series aired a one-hour special episodes on prime time.

Adaptations

References

External links 
 
 Thirumathi Hitler at ZEE5

Zee Tamil original programming
2020 Tamil-language television series debuts
Tamil-language romantic comedy television series
Tamil-language television shows
2022 Tamil-language television series endings
Television shows set in Tamil Nadu
Tamil-language television series based on Hindi-language television series